99 (ninety-nine) is the natural number following 98 and preceding 100.

In mathematics
99 is:

a Kaprekar number
a lucky number
a palindromic number
the ninth repdigit
the sum of the cubes of three consecutive integers: 99 = 23 + 33 + 43
the sum of the sums of the divisors of the first 11 positive integers.
the highest two digit number in decimal.

In music
"99", a song by the band Toto on the Hydra album.
"99 Bottles of Beer", a counting song.
"99 Luftballons", a German-language song by the band Nena.
"99 Problems", a song by Jay-Z on The Black Album.
"99 Ways to Die", a song by Megadeth on the Hidden Treasures EP.

In other fields
The atomic number of einsteinium, an actinide.
 ".99" is frequently used as a price ender in pricing.
99, the jersey number of Wayne Gretzky, since permanently retired

References

External links

Integers